Catherine Marsh or Miss C. M. Marsh (15 September 1818 – 12 December 1912) was an English philanthropist and author writing about soldiers and navvies during the 1850s.

Life
Marsh was born in Colchester at the vicarage for St Peters church in 1818. Her mother was Maria Chowne (born Tilson) and her father was William Marsh, a clergyman with whom she lived all her life. In 1850 she was concerned about the soldiers bound for the Crimean War. She decided to write about the short life of a Christian soldier and Memorials of Captain Hedley Vicars was published in 1855. It was well read and 78,000 copies were sold in the first twelve months. Two years later she published a similar work English Hearts and English Hands which sympathetically described the navvy's life having witnessed the workers who had been re-building the Crystal Palace. That book led to an exchange of letters with Julia Wightman who was an advocate for Temperance in Shrewsbury. In 1859 Wightman published her own book that included many of the letters.

Marsh published The Life of Arthur Vandeleur, Major, Royal Artillery in 1862.

In 1866 there was an outbreak of Cholera and Marsh created a convalescent home in Brighton. The following year she published a biography of her father who had died in 1864.

Marsh died in Feltwell rectory in Norfolk in 1912.

Five years after her death in 1917, The Life and Friendships of Catherine Marsh by Lucy Elizabeth Marshall O'Rorke was published.

References

External links

1818 births
1912 deaths
People from Colchester
English women non-fiction writers
19th-century English non-fiction writers
19th-century English women